The Astrid Lindgren-priset, or Astrid Lindgren Prize in English, is a Swedish literary award named after the Swedish writer Astrid Lindgren of the same name. The prize was instituted by the publishing house Rabén & Sjögren in 1967 to honour Lindgren on her 60th birthday.

It is awarded annually on Lindgren's birthday, 14 November, to a Swedish writer for children and young adults; this distinguishes it from the Astrid Lindgren Memorial Award which has a more international focus.

Recipients 
Source:

 1967: Åke Holmberg
 1968: Ann Mari Falk
 1969: Harry Kullman
 1970: Lennart Hellsing
 1971: Hans Peterson
 1972: Maria Gripe
 1973: Barbro Lindgren
 1974: Inger and Lasse Sandberg
 1975: Hans-Eric Hellberg
 1976: Irmelin Sandman Lilius
 1977: Kerstin Thorvall
 1978: Gunnel Linde
 1979: Rose Lagercrantz
 1980: Maud Reuterswärd (posthumously)
 1981: Gunilla Bergström
 1982: Inger Brattström
 1983: Siv Widerberg 
 1984: Astrid Bergman Sucksdorff 
 1985: Viveca Lärn
 1986: Margareta Strömstedt
 1987: Nan Inger Östman 
 1988: Lena Anderson and Christina Björk 
 1989: Annika Holm 
 1990: Maj Bylock 
 1991: Max Lundgren 
 1992: Sven Christer Swahn 
 1993: Ulf Stark 
 1994: Eva Wikander 
 1995: Peter Pohl 
 1996: Henning Mankell 
 1997: Anna-Clara and Thomas Tidholm 
 1998: Bo R. Holmberg 
 1999: Per Nilsson 
 2000: Annika Thor 
 2001: Eva Eriksson 
 2002: Stefan Casta 
 2003: Sven Nordqvist
 2004: Pernilla Stalfelt
 2005: Jujja Wieslander
 2006: Ulf Nilsson
 2007: Helena Östlund
 2008: Pija Lindenbaum
 2009: Olof and Lena Landström
 2010: Moni Nilsson-Brännström
 2011: Jan Lööf
 2012: Katarina Kieri
 2013: Katarina von Bredow
 2014: Frida Nilsson
 2015: Mårten Sandén
 2016: Anna Höglund
 2017: Jenny Jägerfeld
 2018: Lisa Bjärbo
 2019: Kerstin Lundberg Hahn
 2020: Jakob Wegelius
 2021: Ylva Karlsson

References 

Swedish literary awards
Astrid Lindgren
Awards established in 1967
1967 establishments in Sweden